"Change Me" is a song by Canadian singer Justin Bieber from his second compilation album Journals (2013) discussing his life after the world turned on him was released on December 2, 2013. The song is the ninth in Bieber's series Music Mondays, the first eight being "Heartbreaker" (October 7, 2013), "All That Matters" (October 14), "Hold Tight" (October 21), "Recovery" (October 28), "Bad Day" (November 4), "All Bad" (November 11), "PYD" (November 18) and "Roller Coaster" (November 25). Bieber released a new single every week for 10 weeks from October 7 to December 9, 2013.

Track listing

Chart performance

References

2013 singles
Justin Bieber songs
2013 songs
Island Records singles
Pop ballads
Songs written by Justin Bieber
Songs written by Andre Harris
Songs written by Poo Bear